Gearoid Towey (born 26 March 1977 in Fermoy, Ireland) is an Irish Olympic athlete, former world champion in rowing, and trans-Atlantic rower. He competed at three Olympics – Sydney 2000, Athens 2004 and Beijing 2008.

Towey, along with Ciaran Lewis, attempted to cross the Atlantic Ocean in 2005 in a 23 ft rowing boat. After 40 days at sea, having endured two tropical storms and a hurricane on the way, their boat was pitch poled by a 10-meter wave, leaving the men adrift 900 miles from landfall. They were rescued in the middle of a force 9 storm at night by the supertanker "Hispania Spirit".

He lives in Sydney Australia and is the founder of Crossing the Line Sport – an organisation dedicated to athlete mental health and transition out of sport. He is a regular speaker on the topic of transition, especially the transition from elite athlete to the next phase of life.

References

External links
 

Irish male rowers
Olympic rowers of Ireland
1977 births
Living people
Rowers at the 2000 Summer Olympics
Rowers at the 2004 Summer Olympics
Rowers at the 2008 Summer Olympics
World Rowing Championships medalists for Ireland
People educated at St Colman's College, Fermoy
21st-century Irish people